Casa Italiana is a building at Columbia University located at 1161 Amsterdam Avenue between West 116th and 118th Streets in the Morningside Heights neighborhood of Manhattan, New York City, which houses the university's Italian Academy for Advanced Studies in America. It was built in 1926–27 and was designed by William M. Kendall of McKim, Mead & White in the Renaissance style, modeled after a 15th-century Roman palazzo. The building was restored, and the east facade completed, in 1996 by Buttrick White & Burtis with Italo Rota as associate architect.

History 

In the 1920s, Italian student clubs il Circolo Italiano at Columbia and Barnard mobilized support for a Casa Italiana project. Columbia President Nicholas Murray Butler embraced the idea. The Casa campaign was led in New York by the students and by Judge John J. Freschi (who helped raise money). They reached out to New York developers Joseph Paterno, Anthony Campagna and Michael Paterno, who erected the building and covered all costs beyond contributions.

Some support came from abroad: Italy’s Fascist leader Benito Mussolini expressed enthusiasm, but he promised more than he gave. Records show only some scholarship funding from the Fascist government, and a pledge of antique furniture “to be obtained in Italy through the help of Mussolini”—but this donation never materialized, and the furnishings and artwork came instead from domestic patrons.

McKim, Mead & White, the firm responsible for the layout of Columbia's campus, created an impressive neo-Renaissance design for the Casa Italiana with limestone cladding all over, which set it apart from all other buildings on campus except for the imposing Low Library. Modeled on Roman palazzi of the Renaissance, the building opened in 1927. Dr. Charles Paterno generously gave 20,000 leather-bound books and funding for the Casa's original library.

In 1991, the Italian Republic purchased the property for $17.5 million and leased it back to Columbia for 500 years. Renovations were undertaken, the remaining Paterno collection of books was moved to the Butler Library (many books had gone to Butler over the decades already, as the collection outgrew the Casa's Library early on), and the Italian Department was relocated from the Casa Italiana to its current home in Hamilton Hall, and The Casa building became the seat of the Italian Academy for Advanced Studies, a center for research in the humanities and sciences. A new mission was proclaimed in its Charter: “to offer a privileged vision of Europe from an Italian perspective.” Overseeing the Italian Academy is a board of guarantors, half being appointed by the university and half by the Italian government.

In 2012, a lawsuit filed by the Italic Institute, an advocacy group, in conjunction with the surviving Paterno Family, claimed that Columbia had breached its responsibilities in regard to the building's use. It claimed that the University violated the donative intent of 1927 by converting the building from a cultural center opened to the students of Columbia and the seat of the Department of Italian to a restricted research facility. The New York State Supreme Court dismissed the suit for “lack of standing" and did not rule on the substance of the complaint.

Casa Italiana is one of three buildings on Columbia's campus that is designated by the New York City Landmarks Preservation Commission, having achieved that status in 1978. It was also added to the National Register of Historic Places in 1982.

See also 
List of New York City Designated Landmarks in Manhattan above 110th Street
National Register of Historic Places listings in Manhattan above 110th Street

References

External links 

  In The Italian American experience: an encyclopedia
 The Italian Academy

Buildings and structures on the National Register of Historic Places in Manhattan
Buildings and structures completed in 1927
Columbia University campus
University and college buildings on the National Register of Historic Places in New York (state)
Morningside Heights, Manhattan
McKim, Mead & White buildings
1927 establishments in New York City